Martin Ulrich (born December 16, 1969) is a retired Austrian ice hockey defenceman. He was the captain of the Austrian national ice hockey team.

Born  in Vienna, Austria, Ulrich began his career with three seasons at Vienna before joining Graz EC in 1991 again in a three-year spell. After a brief return to Vienna, Ulrich moved to the Deutsche Eishockey Liga in Germany, playing for the Adler Mannheim for two seasons. He returned to Vienna for a third time before returning to the DEL in 1999, with spells for the Berlin Capitals and the DEG Metro Stars where he spent four seasons.

In 2005, Ulrich returned to Austria and signed for Red Bull Salzburg, where he played two more seasons before ending his player career in 2008 with the lower class team of EK Zell am See.

In October 2009 Ulrich was named Head Coach of the Austrian U-18 national ice hockey team.

International 
Ulrich played 228 games for the Austrian national ice hockey team, attending 17 World Championships and 3 Olympic Games (1994, 1998, 2002).

Career statistics

Regular season and playoffs

International

External links

1969 births
Adler Mannheim players
Austrian ice hockey defencemen
Berlin Capitals players
DEG Metro Stars players
EC Graz players
EC Red Bull Salzburg players
Ice hockey players at the 1994 Winter Olympics
Ice hockey players at the 1998 Winter Olympics
Ice hockey players at the 2002 Winter Olympics
Living people
Olympic ice hockey players of Austria
Ice hockey people from Vienna
Wiener EV players